Munawwar Hussain (born 17 October 1943) is a former cricketer who played first-class cricket in Pakistan from 1961 to 1975.

A slow left-arm orthodox spinner, he was the most successful bowler in the 1964-65 Pakistan season with 59 wickets at an average of 14.61. His best performance that season was for Public Works Department against Railways, when he took 7 for 65 and 3 for 104.

In 1966-67 he took 6 for 35 and 2 for 56 for South Zone against the MCC Under-25 team. He later played in one of the three matches the Pakistan Under-25 team played against MCC Under-25, but took only one wicket. In 1970-71 he took his best innings and match figures: 8 for 163 and 4 for 82 (match figures of 70–10–245–12) for Pakistan International Airlines B against his former team Karachi Blues.

In 1973-74 he was the only Pakistani selected to play for a Rest of the World XI against Pakistan. He was the Rest of the World XI’s most successful bowler, with five wickets. Two weeks later, captaining Pakistan International Airlines B, he took 4 for 42 and 6 for 63 in an innings victory over Quetta.

He later served as a match referee.

References

External links
 
 

1943 births
Living people
Pakistani cricketers
Karachi cricketers
Pakistan International Airlines cricketers
Public Works Department cricketers
Cricketers from Hyderabad, Sindh